KPOP may refer to:

 K-pop, an abbreviation for South Korean popular music
 K'Pop (band), a South Korean group containing usually more than 3 members.
 KPOP (FM), a radio station (94.3 FM) licensed to serve Hartshorne, Oklahoma, United States
 KPOP-LP, a defunct low-power radio station (107.7 FM) formerly licensed to serve Sapulpa, Oklahoma
 KTNQ, a radio station (1020 AM) licensed to serve Los Angeles, California, United States, which held the call sign KPOP from 1955 to 1960
 KPOP (musical), a 2017 off-Broadway musical